Vinaxuki or Xuan Kien Auto JSC was a Vietnamese automaker (and brand name) headquartered in Hanoi, Vietnam. Established in 2004, the company manufactured and assembled cars and mini trucks under its own brand name as well as other Chinese brands. Since it was established, Vinaxuki launched 38 truck models, two semi-truck models, two touring car models and two coach models. Operation ceased in 2015.

Products

Automobiles
Vinaxuki Pickup 650X – Pick-up truck
Songhuajiang HFJ6376 – Minivan
Hafei HFJ7110E – Subcompact hatchback

Minitrucks
Vinaxuki 3500TL, 990T, 1490T
Jinbei: various models
Songhuajiang HFJ1011G

Trucks
Vinaxuki 3450T, 5500TL, 8500TL, 2500BA, 3000BA, 4500BA, 5000BA, 7000BA

External links
Vinaxuki Homepage

Car manufacturers of Vietnam
Vehicle manufacturing companies established in 2004
Vehicle manufacturing companies disestablished in 2015
2015 disestablishments in Vietnam
Vietnamese brands
Manufacturing companies based in Hanoi
Vietnamese companies established in 2004